Responsible Gambling, also known as Safer Gambling, is the set of social responsibility initiatives by the gambling industry – including governments, regulators, operators, and vendors – to ensure the integrity and fairness of their operations, and to promote awareness of the harms associated with gambling, such as gambling addiction.

Areas

Gambling addiction 
Commitments to promoting awareness of gambling addiction are included within the concept of responsible gambling and can include customer-imposed limits and self-exclusion schemes. In the United Kingdom, several major banks have also offered the ability for customers to block gambling-related transactions on their credit cards. NatWest introduced a pilot in October 2019 to allow GamCare appointments to be scheduled at selected branches. Earlier in the year, the UK also imposed bet limits on fixed odds betting terminals as part of an effort to control gambling addiction associated with them.

In the interest of combating addiction, gambling operators in the UK are also obliged to provide certain tools allowing players to restrict their own play. These include: 

 Self Exclusion / Time Out – allowing players to put their account on temporary (reversible) hiatus.
 Reality Check – a pop-up is triggered at certain time intervals to remind players to take a break / stop playing.
 Time Limits – used for setting strict time limits on playing sessions.
 Deposit Limits / Account Tracker – used for enforcing a limit on deposits.
 Permanent Account Closure – lets players close their account and cut off all contact with the gambling operator.
 Credit Card Restrictions - make a request to your bank to block your access to internet transactions

Underage gambling 
The industry has also partaken in commitments to prevent those who are not appropriately aged from participating in gambling activities. Key initiatives have included the efforts of the American Gaming Association (AGA), which adopted a comprehensive guideline for underage gambling, as well as the unattended minors guideline developed with the National Center for Missing and Exploited Children. In 2017, the organization announced a code of conduct for its members, which included specific training requirements for employees to deal with underage gaming.

Fraudulent and criminal behavior 
Operators are required to implement anti-money laundering policies and procedures. This involves implementing effective know-your-customer processes when taking on new customers and tracking and reporting any suspicious transactions.

Information privacy 
Information privacy refers to the protection of customer data and records against unauthorized or unnecessary disclosure.  Operators are required  to implement policies that ensure controls and measures are in place to prevent unauthorized disclosure and use of customer information.  Customer information typically relates to data such as name, address, age, telephone number, and email address.

Prompt and accurate customer payments 
Operators must ensure that payments to and from customer accounts must be conducted according to formal and documented processes in an accurate and timely manner.  Operators typically ensure that customer funds are managed separately from their own accounts and that they have sufficient cleared funds to pay all player prize wins and outstanding player balances.

Fair gaming 
All gaming products should be tested to ensure they are fair, random and that they adhere to the rules of that game.  Testing to ensure independent organizations increasingly carry out fair gaming. These organizations must make sure all online gaming experiences, like pokies and slots, are reliable and fair.

Ethical and responsible marketing 
Operators should comply with the relevant regulatory advertising codes of practice which typically ensure that advertisements are factually correct and do not target underage or vulnerable gamblers, such as players who have self-excluded themselves from gambling.  It is also expected that operators should seek permission from the customer before engaging in direct marketing through the use of the customer’s personal details.

Customer satisfaction 
Customers should be able to freely make comments or complaints to operators and expect operators to have in place adequate processes and procedures to deal with complaints, either internally or via an independent third party. For example, ecogra.org provides a mediation service for disputes between players and operators.

Secure, safe, and reliable operating environment 
Operators are required  to demonstrate internal controls and processes that adhere to the licensing conditions as stipulated by the regulatory jurisdiction that issues gaming and gambling licenses.  Internal controls should also be implemented to ensure that all operational, payment and technical systems and processes operate securely and effectively. In addition, operators need to demonstrate adequate business continuity management procedures to ensure that operations can continue in the event of unforeseen circumstances or disasters.

Responsible gaming codes of conduct 
To ensure operators, software suppliers, and associated service providers uphold the principles of responsible gaming, codes of conduct have been developed by numerous regulators, trade associations, and non-profit organizations. These competing and overlapping codes of conduct or standards have evolved over time due to the evolution of multiple legal and trade frameworks.

It has been acknowledged within the industry that given the large number of responsible gaming codes of conduct, there is a need to step back and re-assess what is required within the industry. The European Committee for Standardization is in the process of developing Responsible Remote Gambling Measures that can protect customers and ensure that the remote gambling operators, software suppliers, and associated service providers behave responsibly, which would be adopted voluntarily.

Responsible gaming events 
Several industry events have been organized to help the industry promote responsible gaming practices. The European Gaming and Betting Association organized the EGBA Responsible Gaming Day conference in the European Parliament in October 2010.

References 

Gambling and society
Online gambling